Tatlong Baraha is a 2006 Filipino action-fantasy film directed by Toto Natividad and starring Lito Lapid and his sons Mark and Meynard. The film is a remake of the 1981 film of the same name, also starring Lito Lapid and featuring his brothers Rey and Efren. The film brings together Leon Guerrero, Julio Valiente and Geronimo, all characters that Lito Lapid previously played in separate movie franchises, to form a vigilante super team. The film is an official entry to the 2006 Metro Manila Film Festival.

Plot
The father and sons triumvirate play three oppressed Filipinos during the Spanish regime, a cowardly farmer (Lito Lapid), a mentally challenged man (Mark Lapid), and a hunchback bell ringer (Maynard Lapid). Because of their sufferings, they were blessed with powers to help their fellowmen. They became warriors which symbolizes hope, heroes and defenders of the oppressed and poor, they are Zigomar (Maynard Lapid), Julio Valiente (Mark Lapid) and Leon Guerrero (Lito Lapid) ready to fight for justice and freedom against evil.

Cast
 Lito Lapid as Leo/Leonard/Leon Guerrero
 Mark Lapid as Julian/Doc Julius/Julio Valiente
 Maynard Lapid as Mar/Marcial/Zigomar
 Monsour del Rosario as Faustino
 Bearwin Meily as Tomas/Lolo/Tom
 Phoemela Baranda as Corazon/Cory
 Girlie Sevilla as Paula/Paulyn
 Jackie Rice as Juana/Jacky
 Charlie Davao as Hepe General
 Jess Lapid Jr.
 King Gutierrez
 Boy Roque
 Basty Alcances
 Nikki Bagaporo
 Kathryn Bernardo as Inah Valiente 
 Cyruss Morning Co
 Igi Boy Flores
 Trina Hopia Legaspi
 John Manalo
 Miles Ocampo

Awards

References

External links
 

2006 films
2000s fantasy action films
Philippine fantasy action films
Films directed by Toto Natividad